Hyalobathra variabilis is a moth in the family Crambidae. It was described by John Frederick Gates Clarke in 1971. It is found in Rapa Iti, French Polynesia.

References

Moths described in 1971
Pyraustinae